The term orange drink refers to a sweet, sugary, sometimes carbonated, orange-flavored drink.

Typically such beverages contain little or no orange juice and are mainly composed of water, sugar or sweeteners, flavor, coloring, and additives, sometimes in that order.  As such, they are very low in nutritional value, although many are fortified with vitamin C.  In 2002, however, a "cheap, fortified, orange-flavored drink" was developed with the intention of improving nutrition in the third world by adding vitamin A, iron, and iodine to people's diets.

Because orange drinks can be confused with orange juice, the U.S. government requires orange drinks, as well as other beverages whose names allude to fruit products, to state the percentage of juice contained above the "Nutrition Facts" label. and requires companies to state them as orange drinks instead of orange juice.

Varieties
 Orange squash
 Orangeade can refer either to a non-carbonated orange drink, or a carbonated orange soft drink. Non-alcoholic orangeade can be made from orange juice, simple syrup, lemon juice, vanilla extract, salt, and club soda or water. An alcoholic version can be made using, e.g., gin, lemon juice, orange juice, and club soda, or, alternatively, tequila, orange juice, simple syrup, and seltzer; or by taking non-alcoholic orangeade and adding vodka.
 McDonald's Orange Drink, also often termed "orangeade" on menus until the 1970s; replaced with Hi-C Orange Lavaburst in some areas. It was discontinued in April 2017.
 Nutri Star (the Venezuelan version of "fortified orange drink.")
 Sunny Delight
 Tang
 Kwenchy Kups, a sugar-free orange flavour drink sold in plastic pots.
 A product named Orange Drink, marketed by the Dairy Maid company on the Bahamian island of New Providence.

See also

Orange juice
Orange soft drink
Squash (drink)

References

Non-alcoholic drinks
Orange sodas